Up Yours may refer to:
"Up Yours", song by the Edgar Broughton Band, released in 1970
"Up Yours", song by the Goo Goo Dolls from their album Jed